Another Place, Another Time is the eighth album by the musician Jerry Lee Lewis, released in 1968 by Smash Records. It was Lewis's "comeback album" and features a stripped down, "hardcore" country sound that yielded two top five country hits, his first major chart success in a decade.

Background
By 1968, Jerry Lee Lewis had been touring the United States and Europe consistently for ten years in hopes of re-establishing the stardom that he had enjoyed during his time at Sun Records in the 1950s, before his marriage to his thirteen-year-old cousin Myra derailed his career. Although he remained a riveting live performer (as can be heard on the album Live at the Star Club, 1964), he had not been a relevant presence on the charts, although he had had a minor hit with a cover of the Ray Charles song "What'd I Say" in 1961. In 1963, Lewis left Sun for Smash (later absorbed into Mercury Records) but, despite a string of musically diverse albums, did not have another hit. "When the DJs stopped playing my records, I never said anything," Lewis explained in the sleeve for the 2006 retrospective A Half Century of Hits. "What could I do? Hollar and scream at 'em? For a while they wasn't playing Elvis, Chuck Berry, or none of them. You'd think rock 'n’ roll had died in the night. All they played was them Bobbys – Bobby Vee, Bobby Vinton, Bobby Rydell, Bobby Darin. If your name was Bobby, you were in with a sporting chance. I must be the only artist in the world who's been down as many times as I have. I mean down to rock bottom. I was making ten thousand a night, and got knocked back to two-fifty."  Frustrated at what he saw as a lack of support from his record label, Lewis was nearing the end of his contract when the promotions manager Eddie Kilroy called him and pitched the idea of recording a pure country record in Nashville. By this point, Lewis' commercial stock was extremely low. In Nick Tosches' Lewis biography, Hellfire, Kilroy recalls calling every credible publisher in Nashville asking for material for Lewis, but only three tapes turned up after two weeks, adding, "That was all the material that had come in. Nobody wanted a Jerry Lee Lewis cut. I thought, Holy God, this is embarrassing."

With nothing to lose, Lewis agreed to record the Jerry Chestnut song "Another Place, Another Time", which was released as a single on March 9, 1968, and, to everyone's amazement, shot up the country charts. At the time of the release, Lewis had been playing Iago in a rock and roll adaptation of Othello called Catch My Soul in Los Angeles but was soon rushed back to Nashville to record another batch of songs with the producer Jerry Kennedy. In a 2019 interview with Randy Fox of Vintage Rock, Kennedy recalled, "Another Place, Another Time" was another thing. It was one heck of a song. Eddie Kilroy, who was promotions manager for Smash at the time, found the song. When he brought the demo in, I got fired up. I sent it to Jerry Lee, and he got excited too... As soon as we cut it there was excitement here in Nashville. It got passed around in town and everyone loved it. George Jones called me and said, "My God, man. Why haven't you been doing this for years with Jerry Lee?""

Recording
Although he was primarily known as a rock and roller, Lewis had been influenced by a wide range of artists and styles, from rhythm and blues to the Great American Songbook, but his affinity for country music – especially the songs of Hank Williams – remained a major part of his repertoire.  As the country music historian Colin Escott observes in the sleeve to the 1995 compilation Killer Country, the conversion to country music in 1968 "looked at the time like a radical shift, but it was neither as abrupt nor as unexpected as it seemed. Jerry had always recorded country music, and his country breakthrough 'Another Place, Another Time' had been preceded by many, many country records starting with his first, 'Crazy Arms,' in 1956." The last time Lewis had a song on the country charts was with "Pen And Paper" in 1964, which had reached number 36, but "Another Place, Another Time" went all the way to number 4 and remained on the charts for 17 weeks.

The production of the album that followed was sparse, quite different from the slick "Nashville sound" that was predominant on country radio at the time, and also expressed a full commitment by Lewis to a country audience. Lewis released the Glenn Sutton-written "What's Made Milwaukee Famous (Has Made A Loser Out of Me)" as his next single, which rose to number 2 on the Billboard country chart, giving him his second consecutive top five hit. Featuring Kennedy's chiming lead guitar and Charlie McCoy's campfire harmonica introduction, Lewis' biographer Joe Bonomo writes in his book, Jerry Lee Lewis: Lost And Found, "The arrangement, including a woodblock rather than a snare, is prime honky-tonk: no instrument dominates, all complement... Everyone involved in the recording must have known that it would be a hit." Never much of a songwriter himself, Lewis included two other Chestnut songs, including "Play Me A Song I Can Cry To" and "On The Back Row", and fleshed out the album with covers of popular country songs, such as the Merle Haggard hit "I'm A Lonesome Fugitive" and the Ernest Tubb classic  "Walking The Floor Over You". He also recorded the Fred Rose country standard "We Live in Two Different Worlds" as a duet with his sister Linda Gail Lewis. All the songs have stone country arrangements, augmented by Lewis's inimitable piano flourishes, but critics were most taken aback by the rock and roll pioneer's effortlessly soulful vocals, which possessed an emotional resonance on a par with the most respected country singers of the time, such as Haggard and George Jones. In his book Jerry Lee Lewis: His Own Story, the biographer Rick Bragg notes that the songs Lewis was recording "were of the kind they were starting to call 'hard country,' not because it had a rock beat or crossed over into rock in a real way, but because it was more substantial than the cloying, overproduced mess out there on country radio".

Rocker and Lewi'ss fan Rod Stewart covered "What's Made Milwaukee Famous (Has Made A Loser Out of Me)" in 1972 and joined Lewis on a version of the song for Lewis's 2006 album, Last Man Standing.

Reception
Another Place, Another Time was released in June 1968 and rose to number 3 on the Billboard country albums chart. In the February 1, 1969, issue of Rolling Stone, the critic Andy Boehm wrote that the album was "definitely worth buying if you can find it. For rock aficionados Another Place Another Time is an interesting representation of an early rock & roll star's transformation. For country music lovers, this album introduces another great and moving singer." AllMusic'''s Stephen Thomas Erlewine wrote of the album, "Song for song, there's not a bad tune here, and each performance is a stunner, making for not just a great second beginning, but for one of the greatest hardcore country albums ever." In 2009, the producer Jerry Kennedy told Lewis's biographer Joe Bonomo that when the album had a quarter-million sales, Mercury's Chicago office called him to ask what pop stations were playing it "because it couldn't'' be selling that many country. And it was not playing on pop anywhere. It was all country radio doing the job."

Track listing

References

Jerry Lee Lewis albums
1968 albums
Albums produced by Jerry Kennedy
Smash Records albums